Bjorkman or Björkman is a Swedish-language surname. Notable people with the surname include:

 Carl Björkman (1869–1960), Swedish sport shooter
 Carl Björkman (politician) (1873–1948), Finnish politician
 Christer Björkman (born 1957), Swedish singer
 Ernie Bjorkman, U.S. television presenter
 Frances Maule Bjorkman (1879-1956), National Woman Suffrage Association
 George Bjorkman (born 1956), U.S. baseball player
 Gustav Björkman (born 1976), Swedish bandy player
 Jan Björkman (born 1950), Swedish politician
 Jonas Björkman (born 1972), Swedish tennis player
 Pamela J. Bjorkman, U.S. biologist
 Stig Björkman (born 1938), Swedish writer and film critic
 Tönnes Björkman (1888–1959), Swedish sport shooter

Swedish-language surnames